Richard Davalos (November 5, 1930 – March 8, 2016) was an American stage, film, and television actor.

Early life
Davalos was born in New York City of Spanish and Finnish descent. At age six, he acted in a school performance of Cinderella, in which he played both the talking mirror and the prince.

Career
Davalos appeared in East of Eden (1955) as James Dean's brother Aron and portrayed the convict Blind Dick in Cool Hand Luke (1967). His other film credits include roles in I Died a Thousand Times (1955), All the Young Men (1960), The Cabinet of Caligari (1962), Pit Stop (1969), Kelly's Heroes (1970), Brother, Cry for Me (1970), Hot Stuff (1979), Death Hunt (1981), Something Wicked This Way Comes (1983) and Ninja Cheerleaders (2008).

He won the 1956 Theatre World Award for his performances in the Arthur Miller plays A View from the Bridge and A Memory of Two Mondays.

In a 1960 episode of the drama Bonanza, Davalos played a young man planning to kill his father, a sheriff who had sent him to prison. In the American Civil War television series, The Americans, broadcast by NBC in 1961, he played Jeff, the younger brother who joined the Confederate Army, in opposition to Ben, the older brother, played by Darryl Hickman, who joined the Union Army. In 1962, Davalos appeared on Perry Mason as James Anderson in "The Case of the Hateful Hero." In 1964, he appeared in "The Case of the Ice-Cold Hands." He guest-starred in an episode of the espionage drama series Blue Light in 1966.

Personal life
Davalos is the father of actress Elyssa Davalos and musician Dominique Davalos, and grandfather of actress Alexa Davalos (The Chronicles of Riddick).

An image of Davalos appears on the covers of The Smiths' albums Strangeways, Here We Come, Best...I, and ...Best II.

Death
Davalos died March 8, 2016, at St. Joseph Medical Center in Burbank, California.

Filmography

References

External links

 
 

1930 births
2016 deaths
American male film actors
American male television actors
American people of Finnish descent
American people of Spanish descent
American male stage actors
Male actors from New York City
People from the Bronx